Carlos Enrique de Castro Storace (19 April 1979 – 16 February 2015) was an Uruguayan footballer who played as a centre back.

Club career
He played abroad for Deportes Melipilla of Chile, Club San José of Bolivia, and Thrasyvoulos F.C. of Greece.

Death
On 31 January 2015, de Castro was injured when the minibus carrying him and other Estudiantes de Mérida players crashed on the José Antonio Páez highway in Carabobo, Venezuela. In the accident, he suffered a fractured spinal cord. During surgery to correct his injury, de Castro suffered a fatal cardiac arrest due to respiratory failure.

References

1979 births
2015 deaths
Association football defenders
Chilean Primera División players
Club San José players
Deportes Melipilla footballers
Expatriate footballers in Bolivia
Expatriate footballers in Chile
Miramar Misiones players
FC Luzern players
Footballers from Montevideo
Thrasyvoulos F.C. players
Uruguayan footballers
Uruguayan expatriate footballers
Uruguayan expatriate sportspeople in Bolivia
Uruguayan expatriate sportspeople in Chile
Uruguayan expatriate sportspeople in Greece
Expatriate footballers in Greece
Road incident deaths in Venezuela
Deaths from respiratory failure
Uruguayan expatriate sportspeople in Venezuela
Uruguayan expatriate sportspeople in Switzerland